The Moray Way is a long-distance path in the Scottish Highlands. First conceived in 2009, the Way is an amalgam of three of Scotland's Great Trails. These sections embody vivid contrasts between the wildness of Dava Moor, the grandeur of the southern Moray Firth Coast, and the serenity of the beautiful Spey Valley.

Each year, various ultramarathons are run on the Way, including The Moray Way 100 that circles the entire route.

See also
 Dava Way
 Moray Coast Trail
 Speyside Way

References

External links
 Official website
 Long Distance Walkers Association

Footpaths in Highland (council area)
Footpaths in Moray
Rail trails in Scotland
River Spey